Nový Jáchymov is a municipality and village in Beroun District in the Central Bohemian Region of the Czech Republic. It has about 700 inhabitants.

History
Nový Jáchymov was founded in 1810 and it is one of the youngest settlements in the region.

References

Villages in the Beroun District